Makarios II (1870 – 28 June 1950) was Archbishop of Cyprus from 1947 until 1950. He was born Michail Charalambous Papaioannou in the village of Prodromos, Ottoman Cyprus, in 1870.

Biography
In 1895, he was ordained a deacon and left Cyprus for further education. He studied at the Great School of the Nation in Constantinople before entering the Halki seminary.

In 1912, he enlisted in the Hellenic Army and served as chaplain during the Balkan Wars. On 20 March 1917, he was elected Bishop of Kyrenia.

After the disturbances of October 1931, Makarios was exiled by the British administration. He remained in Pangrati, Athens during World War II and returned to Cyprus on 22 December 1946.

Makarios II was elected Archbishop of Cyprus, without an opponent, on 24 December 1947. He died on 28 June 1950 and was succeeded by Makarios III.
Makarios II (1870 – 28 June 1950) was Archbishop of Cyprus from 1947 until 1950.

1870 births
1950 deaths
Archbishops of Cyprus
Greek Cypriot people
Eastern Orthodox Christians from Cyprus
Theological School of Halki alumni